Salvia recognita is a woody-based perennial that is endemic to central Turkey, typically growing in light shade at the base of cliffs, at elevations of less than . It contains a low concentration of salvinorin A, at approximately 213 micrograms per gram of plant material.

A mass of divided leaves forms a small to medium basal clump, with leaves ranging in size from 3-4 inches to nearly 1 foot long, with three or more leaflets. The light green leaves are covered with thick hairs, giving it a grayish cast and thick texture, with each leaf blade having a wine-colored petiole. The flowers are cyclamen-pink, growing in whorls, with calyces that are covered in glands and hairs. The flower stalks reach 2–3 feet long, with many whorls of widely spaced flowers.

Notes

Plants described in 1854
recognita
Flora of Turkey